In economics and in an ecological context, the tragedy of the commons is a situation in which individual users, who have open access to a resource unhampered by shared social structures, formal rules, charges, fees, or taxes that regulate access and use, act independently according to their own self-interest and, contrary to the common good of all users, cause depletion of the resource through their uncoordinated action in the case that there are too many users related to the available resources.

The central element of the concept originated in an essay written in 1833 by the British economist William Forster Lloyd, who used a hypothetical example of the effects of unregulated grazing on common land, also known as "the commons" (in Anglo-Saxon law) in Great Britain and Ireland. In embryonic form the idea can also be found at Aristotle: "That which is common to the greatest number gets the least amount of care. Men pay most attention to what is their own: they care less for what is common."

The theory became widely known as the "tragedy of the commons" after an essay with this title was published in Science written by Garrett Hardin in 1968. It became one of the most cited academic papers ever published and also one of the most heavily criticized, particularly by anthropologists and historians.

Hardin, who wrote a total of 350 articles and 27 books, describes in this early essay that common use will only work reasonably satisfactorily as long as the number of man and beast stay well below the carrying capacity of the land. The availability of resources and the amount of people depending on it should therefore be kept in balance. As a punch-line in the article he writes that a freedom to breed is intolerable.

As a result of discussions carried out in the decade after publication, Hardin in a talk in the early 80s suggested a better wording of the central idea: "Under conditions of overpopulation, freedom in an unmanaged commons brings ruin to all." In 1991, faced with evidence of historical and existing commons, Hardin retracted his original thesis and wrote "The Tragedy of the 'Unmanaged' Commons".

Critical scholars note that although taken as a hypothetical example by Lloyd, the historical demise of the commons of Britain and Europe resulted not from misuse of long-held rights of usage by the commoners, but from the commons' owners enclosing and appropriating the land, abrogating the commoners' rights.

Although open-access resource systems may collapse due to overuse (such as in overfishing), many examples have existed and still do exist where members of a community with regulated access to a common resource co-operate to exploit those resources prudently without collapse, or even creating "perfect order". Elinor Ostrom was awarded the 2009 Nobel Memorial Prize in Economic Sciences for demonstrating this concept in her book Governing the Commons, which included examples of how local communities were able to do this without top-down regulations or privatization. On the other hand, Dieter Helm argues that these examples are context-specific and the tragedy of the commons "is not generally solved this way. If it were, the destruction of nature would not have occurred."

In a modern global economic context, "commons" is taken to mean any open-access and unregulated resource such as the atmosphere, oceans, rivers, ocean fish stocks, or even an office refrigerator. In an Anglo-Saxon legal context the concept of the commons derive from a centuries old principle that not all land can be in private hands, but certain types of goods should only belong to the society. Here commons is a type of property that is neither private nor public, but rather held jointly by the members of a community in the interest of the community, who govern access and use through social structures, traditions, or formal rules.

In environmental science, the "tragedy of the commons" is often cited in connection with sustainable development, meshing economic growth and environmental protection, as well as in the debate over global warming. It has also been used in analyzing behavior in the fields of economics, evolutionary psychology, anthropology, game theory, politics, taxation, and sociology.

Expositions

Lloyd's pamphlet
In 1833, the English economist William Forster Lloyd published a pamphlet which included a hypothetical example of over-use of a common resource. This was the situation of cattle herders sharing a common parcel of land on which they were each entitled to let their cows graze, as was the custom in English villages. He postulated that if a herder put more than his allotted number of cattle on the common, overgrazing could result. For each additional animal, a herder could receive additional benefits, while the whole group shared the resulting damage to the commons. If all herders made this individually rational economic decision, the common could be depleted or even destroyed, to the detriment of all.

Garrett Hardin's article

In 1968, ecologist Garrett Hardin explored this social dilemma in his article "The Tragedy of the Commons", published in the journal Science. The essay derived its title from the pamphlet by Lloyd, which he cites, on the over-grazing of common land.

Hardin discussed problems that cannot be solved by technical means, as distinct from those with solutions that require "a change only in the techniques of the natural sciences, demanding little or nothing in the way of change in human values or ideas of morality". Hardin focused on human population growth, the use of the Earth's natural resources, and the welfare state. Hardin argued that if individuals relied on themselves alone, and not on the relationship between society and man, then people will treat other people as resources, which would lead to the world population growing and for the process to continue. Parents breeding excessively would leave fewer descendants because they would be unable to provide for each child adequately. Such negative feedback is found in the animal kingdom. Hardin said that if the children of improvident parents starved to death, if overbreeding was its own punishment, then there would be no public interest in controlling the breeding of families. Hardin blamed the welfare state for allowing the tragedy of the commons; where the state provides for children and supports overbreeding as a fundamental human right, Malthusian catastrophe is inevitable. Consequently, in his article, Hardin lamented the following proposal from the United Nations:

In addition, Hardin also pointed out the problem of individuals acting in rational self-interest by claiming that if all members in a group used common resources for their own gain and with no regard for others, all resources would still eventually be depleted. Overall, Hardin argued against relying on conscience as a means of policing commons, suggesting that this favors selfish individuals – often known as free riders – over those who are more altruistic.

In the context of avoiding over-exploitation of common resources, Hardin concluded by restating Hegel's maxim (which was quoted by Engels), "freedom is the recognition of necessity". He suggested that "freedom" completes the tragedy of the commons. By recognizing resources as commons in the first place, and by recognizing that, as such, they require management, Hardin believed that humans "can preserve and nurture other and more precious freedoms".

The "Commons" as a modern resource concept
Hardin's article marked the mainstream acceptance of the term "commons" as used to connote a shared resource. As Frank van Laerhoven and Elinor Ostrom have stated: "Prior to the publication of Hardin’s article on the tragedy of the commons (1968), titles containing the words 'the commons', 'common pool resources,' or 'common property' were very rare in the academic literature." They go on to say: "In 2002, Barrett and Mabry conducted a major survey of biologists to determine which publications in the twentieth century had become classic books or benchmark publications in biology. They report that Hardin’s 1968 article was the one having the greatest career impact on biologists and is the most frequently cited".

System archetype 
In systems theory, the commons problem is one of the ten most common system archetypes. The Tragedy of the Commons archetype can be illustrated using a causal loop diagram.

Application

Metaphoric meaning
Like Lloyd and Thomas Malthus before him, Hardin was primarily interested in the problem of human population growth. But in his essay, he also focused on the use of larger (though finite) resources such as the Earth's atmosphere and oceans, as well as pointing out the "negative commons" of pollution (i.e., instead of dealing with the deliberate privatization of a positive resource, a "negative commons" deals with the deliberate commonization of a negative cost, pollution).

As a metaphor, the tragedy of the commons should not be taken too literally. The "tragedy" is not in the word's conventional or theatric sense, nor a condemnation of the processes that lead to it. Similarly, Hardin's use of "commons" has frequently been misunderstood, leading him to later remark that he should have titled his work "The Tragedy of the Unregulated Commons".

The metaphor illustrates the argument that free access and unrestricted demand for a finite resource ultimately reduces the resource through over-exploitation, temporarily or permanently. This occurs because the benefits of exploitation accrue to individuals or groups, each of whom is motivated to maximize use of the resource to the point in which they become reliant on it, while the costs of the exploitation are borne by all those to whom the resource is available (which may be a wider class of individuals than those who are exploiting it). This, in turn, causes demand for the resource to increase, which causes the problem to snowball until the resource collapses (even if it retains a capacity to recover). The rate at which depletion of the resource is realized depends primarily on three factors: the number of users wanting to consume the common in question, the consumptive nature of their uses, and the relative robustness of the common.

The same concept is sometimes called the "tragedy of the fishers", because fishing too many fish before or during breeding could cause stocks to plummet.

Modern commons

The tragedy of the commons can be considered in relation to environmental issues such as sustainability. The commons dilemma stands as a model for a great variety of resource problems in society today, such as water, forests, fish, and non-renewable energy sources such as oil, gas, and coal.

Situations exemplifying the "tragedy of the commons" include the overfishing and destruction of the Grand Banks of Newfoundland, the destruction of salmon runs on rivers that have been dammed (most prominently in modern times on the Columbia River in the Northwest United States and historically in North Atlantic rivers), the devastation of the sturgeon fishery (in modern Russia, but historically in the United States as well), higher sickness and mortality rates from COVID-19 in individualistic cultures with less obligatory collectivism, and, in terms of water supply, the limited water available in arid regions (e.g. the area of the Aral Sea and the Los Angeles water system supply, especially at Mono Lake and Owens Lake).

In economics, an externality is a cost or benefit that affects a party who did not choose to incur that cost or benefit. Negative externalities are a well-known feature of the "tragedy of the commons". For example, driving cars has many negative externalities; these include pollution, carbon emissions, and traffic accidents. Every time Person A gets in a car, it becomes more likely that Person Z (and millions of others) will suffer in each of those areas. Economists often urge the government to adopt policies that "internalize" an externality.

The tragedy of commons can also be referred to the idea of open data. Anonymised data are crucial for useful social research and represent therefore a public resource better said, a common good which is liable to exhaustion. Some feel that the law should provide a safe haven for the dissemination of research data, since it can be argued that current data protection policies overburden valuable research without mitigating realistic risks.

An expansive application of the concept can also be seen in Vyse's analysis of differences between countries in their responses to the COVID-19 pandemic.  Vyse argues that those who defy public health recommendations can be thought of as spoiling a set of common goods, "the economy, the healthcare system, and the very air we breathe, for all of us.

Tragedy of the digital commons 
In the past two decades, scholars have been attempting to apply the concept of the tragedy of the commons to the digital environment. However, between scholars there are differences on some very basic notions inherent to the tragedy of the commons: the idea of finite resources and the extent of pollution. On the other hand, there seems to be some agreement on the role of the digital divide and how to solve a potential tragedy of the digital commons.

Resources and pollution 
In terms of resources, there is no coherent conception of whether digital resources are finite. Some scholars argue that digital resources are infinite because downloading a file does not constitute the destruction of the file in the digital environment. Digital resources, as such, are merely replicated and disseminated throughout the digital environment and as such can be understood as infinite. While others argue that data, for example, is a finite resource because privacy laws and regulations put a significant strain on the access to data.

Finite digital resources include databases that require persistent maintenance, an example being Wikipedia. As a non-profit, it survives on a network of people contributing to maintain a knowledgebase without expectation or compensation. This digital resource will deplete as Wikipedia may only survive if it is contributed to, as used as a commons. The motivation for individuals to contribute is reflective of the theory as if humans act in their own interest and no longer participate, then the resource becomes misinformed or depleted. Arguments surrounding the regulation and mitigation requirements for digital resources may become reflective of natural resources.

This raises the question whether one can view access itself as a finite resource in the context of a digital environment. Some scholars argue this point, often pointing to a proxy for access that is more concrete and measurable. One such proxy is bandwidth, which can become congested when too many people try to access the digital environment. Alternatively, one can think of the network itself as a common resource which can be exhausted through overuse. Therefore, when talking about resources running out in a digital environment, it could be more useful to think in terms of the access to the digital environment being restricted in some way; this is called information entropy.

In terms of pollution, there are some scholars that look only at the pollution that occurs in the digital environment itself. They argue that unrestricted use of digital resources can cause an overproduction of redundant data which causes noise and corrupts communication channels within the digital environment. Others argue that the pollution caused by the overuse of digital resources also causes pollution in the physical environment. They argue that unrestricted use of digital resources causes misinformation, fake news, crime, and terrorism, as well as problems of a different nature such as confusion, manipulation, insecurity, and loss of confidence.

Digital divide and solutions 
Scholars disagree on the particularities underlying the tragedy of the digital commons, however, there does seem to be some agreement on the cause and the solution. The cause of the tragedy of the commons occurring in the digital environment is attributed by some scholars to the digital divide. They argue that there is too large a focus on bridging this divide and provide unrestricted access to everyone. Such a focus on increasing access without the necessary restrictions causes the exploitation of digital resources for individual self interest that is underlying any tragedy of the commons.

In terms of the solution, scholars agree that cooperation rather than regulation is the best way to mitigate a tragedy of the digital commons. The digital world is not a closed system in which a central authority can regulate the users, as such some scholars argue that voluntary cooperation must be fostered. This could perhaps be done through digital governance structure that motivates multiple stakeholders to engage and collaborate in the decision-making process. Other scholars argue more in favor of formal or informal sets of rules, like a code of conduct, to promote ethical behavior in the digital environment and foster trust. Alternative to managing relations between people, some scholars argue that it is access itself that needs to be properly managed, which includes expansion of network capacity.

Examples
More general examples (some alluded to by Hardin) of potential and actual tragedies include:

 Physical resources
 Uncontrolled human population growth leading to overpopulation.
 Atmosphere, through the release of pollution that leads to ozone depletion, global warming, ocean acidification (by way of increased atmospheric  being absorbed by the sea), and particulate pollution
 Light pollution with the loss of the night sky for research and cultural significance, affected human, flora and fauna health, nuisance, trespass and the loss of enjoyment or function of private property.
 Water Water pollution, water crisis of over-extraction of groundwater and wasting water due to overirrigation
 Forests Frontier logging of old growth forest and slash and burn
 Energy resources and climate Environmental residue of mining and drilling, burning of fossil fuels and consequential global warming
 Animals Habitat destruction and poaching leading to the Holocene mass extinction
 Oceans Overfishing
Space debris in Earth's surrounding space leading to limited locations for new satellites and the obstruction of universal observations.
Food Uneven distribution of food leading to world hunger. Overconsumption of plant based foods leading to shortages (e.g. coffea for coffee, cocoa for chocolate).
Human health
In many African and Southeast Asian countries, patriarchal culture creates a preference for sons that causes some people to abort foetal girls. This results in an imbalanced sex ratio in these countries to the extent that they have significantly more males than females, even though the natural male:female ratio is about 1.04:1.
 AntibioticsAntibiotic Resistance: Mis-use of antibiotics anywhere in the world will eventually result in antibiotic resistance developing at an accelerated rate. The resulting antibiotic resistance has spread (and will likely continue to do so in the future) to other bacteria and other regions, hurting or destroying the Antibiotic Commons that is shared on a worldwide basis
 VaccinesHerd immunity: Avoiding a vaccine shot and relying on the established herd immunity instead will avoid potential vaccine risks, but if everyone does this, it will diminish herd immunity and bring risk to people who cannot receive vaccines for medical reasons.
 Other
 Knowledge commons encompass immaterial and collectively owned goods in the information age, including, for example:
 Source code and software documentation in software projects that can get "polluted" with messy code or inaccurate information.
 Skills acquisition and training, when all parties involved pass the buck on implementing it.

Application to evolutionary biology
A parallel was drawn in 2006 between the tragedy of the commons and the competing behaviour of parasites that through acting selfishly eventually diminish or destroy their common host. The idea has also been applied to areas such as the evolution of virulence or sexual conflict, where males may fatally harm females when competing for matings.

The idea of evolutionary suicide, where adaptation at the level of the individual causes the whole species or population to be driven extinct, can be seen as an extreme form of an evolutionary tragedy of the commons. From an evolutionary point of view, the creation of the tragedy of the commons in pathogenic microbes may provide us with advanced therapeutic methods.

Microbial ecology studies have also addressed if resource availability modulates the cooperative or competitive behaviour in bacteria populations. When resources availability is high, bacterial populations become competitive and aggressive with each other, but when environmental resources are low, they tend to be cooperative and mutualistic.

Ecological studies have hypothesised that competitive forces between animals are major in high carrying capacity zones (i.e. near the Equator), where biodiversity is higher, because of natural resources abundance. This abundance or excess of resources, causes animal populations to have R reproduction strategies (many offspring, short gestation, less parental care, and a short time until sexual maturity), so competition is affordable for populations. Also competition could select populations to have R behaviour in a positive feedback regulation.

Contrary, in low carrying capacity zones (i.e. far from the equator), where environmental conditions are harsh K strategies are common (longer life expectancy, produce relatively fewer offspring and tend to be altricial, requiring extensive care by parents when young) and populations tend to have cooperative or mutualistic behaviors. If populations have a competitive behaviour in hostile environmental conditions they mostly are filtered out (die) by environmental selection, hence populations in hostile conditions are selected to be cooperative.

Climate change

The effects of climate change have been given as a mass example of the tragedy of the commons. This perspective proposes that the earth, being the commons, has suffered a depletion of natural resources without regard to the externalities, the impact on neighboring and future populations. The collective actions of individuals, organisations, and governments continue to contribute to environmental degradation. Mitigation of the long-term impacts and tipping points require strict controls or other solution, but this may come as a loss to different industries. The sustainability of population and industry growth is the subject of climate change discussion. The global commons of environmental resource consumption or selfishness, as in the fossil fuel industry has been theorised as not realistically manageable. This is due to the crossing of irreversible thresholds of impact before the costs are entirely realised.

Commons dilemma

The commons dilemma is a specific class of social dilemma in which people's short-term selfish interests are at odds with long-term group interests and the common good. In academia, a range of related terminology has also been used as shorthand for the theory or aspects of it, including resource dilemma, take-some dilemma, and common pool resource.

Commons dilemma researchers have studied conditions under which groups and communities are likely to under- or over-harvest common resources in both the laboratory and field. Research programs have concentrated on a number of motivational, strategic, and structural factors that might be conducive to management of commons.

In game theory, which constructs mathematical models for individuals' behavior in strategic situations, the corresponding "game", developed by Hardin, is known as the Commonize Costs – Privatize Profits Game (CC–PP game).

Psychological factors
Kopelman, Weber, & Messick (2002), in a review of the experimental research on cooperation in commons dilemmas, identify nine classes of independent variables that influence cooperation in commons dilemmas: social motives, gender, payoff structure, uncertainty, power and status, group size, communication, causes, and frames. They organize these classes and distinguish between psychological individual differences (stable personality traits) and situational factors (the environment). Situational factors include both the task (social and decision structure) and the perception of the task.

Empirical findings support the theoretical argument that the cultural group is a critical factor that needs to be studied in the context of situational variables. Rather than behaving in line with economic incentives, people are likely to approach the decision to cooperate with an appropriateness framework. An expanded, four factor model of the Logic of Appropriateness, suggests that the cooperation is better explained by the question: "What does a person like me (identity) do (rules) in a situation like this (recognition) given this culture (group)?"

Strategic factors
Strategic factors also matter in commons dilemmas. One often-studied strategic factor is the order in which people take harvests from the resource. In simultaneous play, all people harvest at the same time, whereas in sequential play people harvest from the pool according to a predetermined sequence – first, second, third, etc. There is a clear order effect in the latter games: the harvests of those who come first – the leaders – are higher than the harvest of those coming later – the followers. The interpretation of this effect is that the first players feel entitled to take more. With sequential play, individuals adopt a first come-first served rule, whereas with simultaneous play people may adopt an equality rule. Another strategic factor is the ability to build up reputations. Research found that people take less from the common pool in public situations than in anonymous private situations. Moreover, those who harvest less gain greater prestige and influence within their group.

Structural factors
Hardin stated in his analysis of the tragedy of the commons that "Freedom in a commons brings ruin to all." One of the proposed solutions is to appoint a leader to regulate access to the common. Groups are more likely to endorse a leader when a common resource is being depleted and when managing a common resource is perceived as a difficult task. Groups prefer leaders who are elected, democratic, and prototypical of the group, and these leader types are more successful in enforcing cooperation. A general aversion to autocratic leadership exists, although it may be an effective solution, possibly because of the fear of power abuse and corruption.

The provision of rewards and punishments may also be effective in preserving common resources. Selective punishments for overuse can be effective in promoting domestic water and energy conservation – for example, through installing water and electricity meters in houses. Selective rewards work, provided that they are open to everyone. An experimental carpool lane in the Netherlands failed because car commuters did not feel they were able to organize a carpool. The rewards do not have to be tangible. In Canada, utilities considered putting "smiley faces" on electricity bills of customers below the average consumption of that customer's neighborhood.

Solutions

Articulating solutions to the tragedy of the commons is one of the main problems of political philosophy. In some situations, locals implement (often complex) social schemes that work well. When these fail, there are many possible governmental solutions such as privatization, internalizing the externalities, and regulation.

Non-governmental solution
Robert Axelrod contends that even self-interested individuals will often find ways to cooperate, because collective restraint serves both the collective and individual interests. Anthropologist G. N. Appell criticized those who cited Hardin to "impos[e] their own economic and environmental rationality on other social systems of which they have incomplete understanding and knowledge."

Political scientist Elinor Ostrom, who was awarded 2009's Nobel Memorial Prize in Economic Sciences for her work on the issue, and others revisited Hardin's work in 1999. They found the tragedy of the commons not as prevalent or as difficult to solve as Hardin maintained, since locals have often come up with solutions to the commons problem themselves. For example, another group found that a commons in the Swiss Alps has been run by a collective of farmers there to their mutual and individual benefit since 1517, in spite of the farmers also having access to their own farmland. In general, it is in the interest of the users of a commons to keep them functioning and so complex social schemes are often invented by the users for maintaining them at optimum efficiency. Another prominent example of this is the deliberative process of granting legal personhood to a part of nature, for example rivers, with the aim of preserving their water resources and prevent environmental degradation. This process entails that a river is regarded as its own legal entity that can sue against environmental damage done to it while being represented by an independently appointed guardian advisory group. This has happened as a bottom-up process in New Zealand: Here debates initiated by the Whanganui Iwi tribe have resulted in legal personhood for the river. The river is considered as a living whole, stretching from mountain to sea and even includes not only the physical but also its metaphysical elements.

Similarly, geographer Douglas L. Johnson remarks that many nomadic pastoralist societies of Africa and the Middle East in fact "balanced local stocking ratios against seasonal rangeland conditions in ways that were ecologically sound", reflecting a desire for lower risk rather than higher profit; in spite of this, it was often the case that "the nomad was blamed for problems that were not of his own making and were a product of alien forces." Independently finding precedent in the opinions of previous scholars such as Ibn Khaldun as well as common currency in antagonistic cultural attitudes towards non-sedentary peoples, governments and international organizations have made use of Hardin's work to help justify restrictions on land access and the eventual sedentarization of pastoral nomads despite its weak empirical basis. Examining relations between historically nomadic Bedouin Arabs and the Syrian state in the 20th century, Dawn Chatty notes that "Hardin's argument was curiously accepted as the fundamental explanation for the degradation of the steppe land" in development schemes for the arid interior of the country, downplaying the larger role of agricultural overexploitation in desertification as it melded with prevailing nationalist ideology which viewed nomads as socially backward and economically harmful.

Elinor Ostrom and her colleagues looked at how real-world communities manage communal resources, such as fisheries, land irrigation systems, and farmlands, and they identified a number of factors conducive to successful resource management. One factor is the resource itself; resources with definable boundaries (e.g. land) can be preserved much more easily. A second factor is resource dependence; there must be a perceptible threat of resource depletion, and it must be difficult to find substitutes. The third is the presence of a community; small and stable populations with a thick social network and social norms promoting conservation do better. A final condition is that there be appropriate community-based rules and procedures in place with built-in incentives for responsible use and punishments for overuse. When the commons is taken over by non-locals, those solutions can no longer be used.

Many of the economic and social structures recommended by Ostrom coincide with the structures recommended by anarchists, particularly green anarchism. The largest contemporary societies that use these organizational strategies are the Rebel Zapatista Autonomous Municipalities and the Autonomous Administration of North and East Syria which have heavily been influenced by anarchism and other versions of libertarian and ecological socialism.

Individuals may act in a deliberate way to avoid consumption habits that deplete natural resources. This consciousness promotes the boycotting of products or brands and seeking alternative, more sustainable options.

Altruistic Punishment 
Various well-established theories, such as theory of kin selection and direct reciprocity, have limitations in explaining patterns of cooperation emerging between unrelated individuals and in non-repeatable short-term interactions. Studies have shown that punishment is a efficacious motivator for cooperation among humans.

Altruistic punishment entails the presence of individuals that punish defectors from a cooperative agreement, although doing so is costly and provides no material gain. These punishments effectively resolve tragedy of the commons scenarios by addressing both first-order free rider problems (i.e defectors free riding on cooperators) and second-order free rider problems (i.e cooperators free riding on work of punishers). Such results can only be witnessed when the punishment levels are high enough.

While defectors are motivated by self-interest and cooperators feel morally obliged to practice self-restraint, punishers pursue this path when their emotions are clouded by annoyance and anger at free riders.

Governmental solutions
Governmental solutions are used when the above conditions are not met (such as a community being larger than the cohesion of its social network). Examples of government regulation include privatization, regulation, and internalizing the externalities.

Privatization
One solution for some resources is to convert common good into private property (Coase 1960), giving the new owner an incentive to enforce its sustainability. Libertarians and classical liberals cite the tragedy of the commons as an example of what happens when Lockean property rights to homestead resources are prohibited by a government. They argue that the solution to the tragedy of the commons is to allow individuals to take over the property rights of a resource, that is, to privatize it.

In England, this solution was attempted in the Inclosure Acts. Economic historian Bob Allen coined the term "Engels' pause" to describe the period from 1790 to 1840, when British working-class wages stagnated and per-capita gross domestic product expanded rapidly during a technological upheaval. .

Regulation
In a typical example, governmental regulations can limit the amount of a common good that is available for use by any individual. Permit systems for extractive economic activities including mining, fishing, hunting, livestock raising, and timber extraction are examples of this approach. Similarly, limits to pollution are examples of governmental intervention on behalf of the commons. This idea is used by the United Nations Moon Treaty, Outer Space Treaty and Law of the Sea Treaty as well as the UNESCO World Heritage Convention (treaty) which involves the international law principle that designates some areas or resources the Common Heritage of Mankind.

In Hardin's essay, he proposed that the solution to the problem of overpopulation must be based on "mutual coercion, mutually agreed upon" and result in "relinquishing the freedom to breed". Hardin discussed this topic further in a 1979 book, Managing the Commons, co-written with John A. Baden. He framed this prescription in terms of needing to restrict the "reproductive right", to safeguard all other rights. Several countries have a variety of population control laws in place.

German historian Joachim Radkau thought Hardin advocates strict management of common goods via increased government involvement or international regulation bodies. An asserted impending "tragedy of the commons" is frequently warned of as a consequence of the adoption of policies which restrict private property and espouse expansion of public property.

Given the current system of rule of law, the solution of giving a legal right to nature at large (from object to subject) could be a game changer. This idea of giving land a legal personality is intended to enable the democratic system of the rule of law to allow for prosecution, sanction, and reparation for damage to the earth. This legal development is not new, it has been put into practice in Ecuador in the form of a constitutional principle known as "Pacha Mama" (Mother Earth).

Internalizing externalities
Privatization works when the person who owns the property (or rights of access to that property) pays the full price of its exploitation. As discussed above negative externalities (negative results, such as air or water pollution, that do not proportionately affect the user of the resource) is often a feature driving the tragedy of the commons. Internalizing the externalities, in other words ensuring that the users of resource pay for all of the consequences of its use, can provide an alternate solution between privatization and regulation. One example is gasoline taxes which are intended to include both the cost of road maintenance and of air pollution. This solution can provide the flexibility of privatization while minimizing the amount of government oversight and overhead that is needed.

The Mid-Way Solution 
One of the significant actions areas which can dwell as potential solution is to have co-shared communities that have partial ownership from governmental side and partial ownership from the community. By ownership, here it is referred to planning, sharing, using, benefiting and supervision of the resources which ensure that the power is not held in one or two hands only. Since, involvement of multiple stakeholders is necessary responsibilities can be shared across them based on their abilities and capacities in terms of human resources, infrastructure development ability, and legal aspects, etc.

Criticism
Hardin's work is criticised as historically inaccurate in failing to account for the demographic transition, and for failing to distinguish between common property and open access resources. In a similar vein, Carl Dahlman argues that commons were effectively managed to prevent overgrazing. Likewise, Susan Jane Buck Cox argues that the common land example used to argue this economic concept is on very weak historical ground, and misrepresents what she terms was actually the "triumph of the commons": the successful common usage of land for many centuries. She argues that social changes and agricultural innovation, and not the behaviour of the commoners, led to the demise of the commons.

Radical environmentalist Derrick Jensen claims the tragedy of the commons is used as propaganda for private ownership. He says it has been used by the political right wing to hasten the final enclosure of the "common resources" of third world and indigenous people worldwide, as a part of the Washington Consensus. He argues that in true situations, those who abuse the commons would have been warned to desist and if they failed would have punitive sanctions against them. He says that rather than being called "The Tragedy of the Commons", it should be called "the Tragedy of the Failure of the Commons".

Marxist geographer David Harvey has a similar criticism, noting that "The dispossession of indigenous populations in North America by 'productive' colonists, for instance, was justified because indigenous populations did not produce value", and asks generally: "Why, for instance, do we not focus in Hardin's metaphor on the individual ownership of the cattle rather than on the pasture as a common?"

Some authors, like Yochai Benkler, say that with the rise of the Internet and digitalisation, an economics system based on commons becomes possible again. He wrote in his book The Wealth of Networks in 2006 that cheap computing power plus networks enable people to produce valuable products through non-commercial processes of interaction: "as human beings and as social beings, rather than as market actors through the price system". He uses the term networked information economy to refer to a "system of production, distribution, and consumption of information goods characterized by decentralized individual action carried out through widely distributed, nonmarket means that do not depend on market strategies." He also coined the term commons-based peer production for collaborative efforts based on sharing information. Examples of commons-based peer production are Wikipedia, free and open source software and open-source hardware.

Tragedy of the commons has served as a pretext for powerful private companies and/or governments to introduce regulatory agents or outsourcing on less powerful entities or governments, for the exploitation of their natural resources. Powerful companies and governments can easily corrupt and bribe less powerful institutions or governments, to allow them exploit or privatize their resources, which causes more concentration of power and wealth in powerful entities. This phenomenon is known as the resource curse.

Comedy of the commons
In certain cases, exploiting a resource more may be a good thing. Carol M. Rose, in a 1986 article, discussed the concept of the "comedy of the commons", where the public property in question exhibits "increasing returns to scale" in usage (hence the phrase, "the more the merrier"), in that the more people use the resource, the higher the benefit to each one. Rose cites as examples commerce and group recreational activities. According to Rose, public resources with the "comedic" characteristic may suffer from under-investment rather than over usage.

A modern example presented by Garrett Richards in environmental studies is that the issue of excessive carbon emissions can be tackled effectively only when the efforts are directly addressing the issues along with the collective efforts from the world economies.  Additionally, the more that nations are willing to collaborate and contribute resources, the higher the chances are for successful technological developments.

See also

Related concepts
 , depriving commoners of their ancient rights

References

Notes

Bibliography
 Angus, I. (2008). "The myth of the tragedy of the commons", Socialist Voice (August 24).
 
 
 
 
 Foddy, M., Smithson, M., Schneider, S., and Hogg, M. (1999). Resolving social dilemmas. Philadelphia, PA: Psychology Press.

External links

 The Digital Library of the Commons
 The Myth of the Tragedy of the Commons by Ian Angus
 "Global Tragedy of the Commons" by John Hickman and Sarah Bartlett
 "Tragedy of the Commons Explained with Smurfs" by Ryan Somma
 Public vs. Private Goods & Tragedy of the Commons
 On averting the Tragedy of the Commons

 
1968 introductions
Economic inequality
Environmental economics
Environmental social science concepts
Game theory
Land use
Market failure
Metaphors
Public commons